Bujru (also Romanized as Būjrū; also known as Borj Rū and Būjūrū) is a village in Tang Chenar Rural District, in the Central District of Mehriz County, Yazd Province, Iran. At the 2006 census, its population was 29, in 12 families.

References 

Populated places in Mehriz County